Ann-Marie Lillemor "Mia" Stadig (born 18 March 1966) is a Swedish biathlete. She competed in three events at the 1992 Winter Olympics.

References

1966 births
Living people
Biathletes at the 1992 Winter Olympics
Swedish female biathletes
Olympic biathletes of Sweden
Place of birth missing (living people)